A Captive Lion is a 1987 biography of Marina Tsvetayeva by Elaine Feinstein. It includes selected poems, Simon Karlinsky's two volume study of the author and Janet Marin King's translations of her prose.

References
The Literary Encyclopedia

1987 books
Russian biographies
Books about poets